Veliky Novgorod, also known as Novgorod, is the largest city and administrative centre of Novgorod Oblast, Russia. It is one of the oldest cities in Russia, being first mentioned in the 9th century. The city lies along the Volkhov River just downstream from its outflow from Lake Ilmen and is situated on the M10 federal highway connecting Moscow and Saint Petersburg. UNESCO recognized Novgorod as a World Heritage Site in 1992. The city has a population of 

At its peak during the 14th century, the city was the capital of the Novgorod Republic and was one of Europe's largest cities. The "Veliky" ("great") part was added to the city's name in 1999.

History

Early developments

The Sofia First Chronicle makes initial mention of it in 859, while the Novgorod First Chronicle first mentions it in 862, when it was purportedly already a major Baltics-to-Byzantium station on the trade route from the Varangians to the Greeks. The Charter of Veliky Novgorod recognizes 859 as the year when the city was first mentioned. Novgorod is traditionally considered to be a cradle of Russian statehood.

The oldest archaeological excavations in the middle to late 20th century, however, have found cultural layers dating back to the late 10th century, the time of the Christianization of Rus' and a century after it was allegedly founded. Archaeological dating is fairly easy and accurate to within 15–25 years, as the streets were paved with wood, and most of the houses made of wood, allowing tree ring dating.

Originally,  referred to the stronghold, now only  to the south of the center of the present-day city, Rurikovo Gorodische (named in comparatively modern times after the Varangian chieftain Rurik, who supposedly made it his "capital" around 860). First mention of this Norse etymology to the name of the city of Novgorod (and that of other cities within the territory of the then Kievan Rus') occurs in the 10th-century policy manual  by Byzantine emperor Constantine VII.

Princely state within Kievan Rus'

In 882, Rurik's successor, Oleg of Novgorod, conquered Kiev and founded the state of Kievan Rus'. Novgorod's size as well as its political, economic, and cultural influence made it the second most important city in Kievan Rus'. According to a custom, the elder son and heir of the ruling Kievan monarch was sent to rule Novgorod even as a minor. When the ruling monarch had no such son, Novgorod was governed by posadniks, such as the legendary Gostomysl, Dobrynya, Konstantin, and Ostromir.

Of all their princes, Novgorodians most cherished the memory of Yaroslav the Wise, who sat as Prince of Novgorod from 1010 to 1019, while his father, Vladimir the Great, was a prince in Kiev. Yaroslav promulgated the first written code of laws (later incorporated into Russkaya Pravda) among the Eastern Slavs and is said to have granted the city a number of freedoms or privileges, which they often referred to in later centuries as precedents in their relations with other princes. His son, Vladimir, sponsored construction of the great St. Sophia Cathedral, more accurately translated as the Cathedral of Holy Wisdom, which stands to this day.

Early foreign ties
In Norse sagas the city is mentioned as the capital of Gardariki. Many Viking kings and yarls came to Novgorod seeking refuge or employment, including Olaf I of Norway, Olaf II of Norway, Magnus I of Norway, and Harald Hardrada. No more than a few decades after the 1030 death and subsequent canonization of Olaf II of Norway, the city's community had erected in his memory Saint Olaf's Church in Novgorod.

The Gotland town of Visby functioned as the leading trading center in the Baltic before the Hansa League. At Novgorod in 1080, Visby merchants established a trading post which they named Gutagard (also known as Gotenhof). Later, in the first half of the 13th century, merchants from northern Germany also established their own trading station in Novgorod, known as Peterhof. At about the same time, in 1229, German merchants at Novgorod were granted certain privileges, which made their position more secure.

Novgorod Republic

In 1136, the Novgorodians dismissed their prince Vsevolod Mstislavich. The year is seen as the traditional beginning of the Novgorod Republic. The city was able to invite and dismiss a number of princes over the next two centuries, but the princely office was never abolished and powerful princes, such as Alexander Nevsky, could assert their will in the city regardless of what Novgorodians said. The city state controlled most of Europe's northeast, from lands east of today's Estonia to the Ural Mountains, making it one of the largest states in medieval Europe, although much of the territory north and east of Lakes Ladoga and Onega was sparsely populated and never organized politically.

Another important local official was the Archbishop of Novgorod who shared power with the boyars.

While a basic outline of the various officials and the  can be drawn up, the city-state's exact political constitution remains unknown. The boyars and the archbishop ruled the city together, although where one official's power ended and another's began is uncertain. The prince, although his power was reduced from around the middle of the 12th century, was represented by his , or lieutenant, and still played important roles as a military commander, legislator and jurist.

In the 13th century, Novgorod, while not a member of the Hanseatic League, was the easternmost kontor, or entrepôt, of the league, being the source of enormous quantities of luxury (sable, ermine, fox, marmot) and non-luxury furs (squirrel pelts).

Throughout the Middle Ages, the city thrived culturally. A large number of birch bark letters have been unearthed in excavations, perhaps suggesting widespread literacy. It was in Novgorod that the Novgorod Codex, the oldest Slavic book written north of Bulgaria, and the oldest inscription in a Finnic language (Birch bark letter no. 292) were unearthed. Some of the most ancient Russian chronicles (Novgorod First Chronicle) were written in the scriptorium of the archbishops who also promoted iconography and patronized church construction. The Novgorod merchant Sadko became a popular hero of Russian folklore.

Novgorod was never conquered by the Mongols during the Mongol invasion of Rus. However, the grand princes of Moscow, who acted as tax collectors for the khans of the Golden Horde, did collect tribute in Novgorod, most notably Yury Danilovich and his brother, Ivan Kalita.

In 1259, Mongol tax-collectors and census-takers arrived in the city, leading to political disturbances and forcing Alexander Nevsky to punish a number of town officials (he cut off their noses) for defying him as Grand Prince of Vladimir (soon to be the khan's tax-collector in Russia) and his Mongol overlords.

During the era of Old Rus' State, Novgorod was a major trade hub at the northern end of both the Volga trade route and the "route from the Varangians to the Greeks" along the Dnieper river system. A vast array of goods were transported along these routes and exchanged with local Novgorod merchants and other traders. The farmers of Gotland retained the Saint Olof trading house well into the 12th century. Later German merchantmen also established tradinghouses in Novgorod. Scandinavian royalty would intermarry with Russian princes and princesses.

After the great schism, Novgorod struggled from the beginning of the 13th century against Swedish, Danish, and German crusaders. During the Swedish-Novgorodian Wars, the Swedes invaded lands where some of the population had earlier paid tribute to Novgorod. The Germans had been trying to conquer the Baltic region since the late 12th century. Novgorod went to war 26 times with Sweden and 11 times with the Livonian Brothers of the Sword. The German knights, along with Danish and Swedish feudal lords, launched a series of uncoordinated attacks in 1240–1242. Novgorodian sources mention that a Swedish army was defeated in the Battle of the Neva in 1240. The Baltic German campaigns ended in failure after the Battle on the Ice in 1242. After the foundation of the castle of Viborg in 1293 the Swedes gained a foothold in Karelia. On August 12, 1323, Sweden and Novgorod signed the Treaty of Nöteborg, regulating their border for the first time.

The city's downfall occurred partially as a result of its inability to feed its large population, making it dependent on the Vladimir-Suzdal region for grain. The main cities in the area, Moscow and Tver, used this dependence to gain control over Novgorod. Eventually Ivan III forcibly annexed the city to the Grand Duchy of Moscow in 1478. The  was dissolved and a significant part of Novgorod's aristocracy, merchants and smaller landholding families was deported to central Russia. The Hanseatic League kontor was closed in 1494 and the goods stored there were seized by Muscovite forces.

Tsardom of Russia

At the time of annexation, Novgorod became the third largest city under Muscovy and then the Tsardom of Russia (with 5,300 homesteads and 25–30 thousand inhabitants in the 1550s) and remained so until the famine of the 1560s and the Massacre of Novgorod in 1570. In the Massacre, Ivan the Terrible sacked the city, slaughtered thousands of its inhabitants, and deported the city's merchant elite and nobility to Moscow, Yaroslavl and elsewhere. The last decade of the 16th century was a comparatively favourable period for the city as Boris Godunov restored trade privileges and raised the status of Novgorod bishop. The German trading post was reestablished in 1603. Even after the incorporation into the Russian state Novgorod land retained its distinct identity and institutions, including the customs policy and administrative division. Certain elective offices were quickly restored after having been abolished by Ivan III.

During the Time of Troubles, Novgorodians submitted to Swedish troops led by Jacob De la Gardie in the summer of 1611. The city was restituted to Muscovy six years later by the Treaty of Stolbovo. The conflict led to further depopulation: the number of homesteads in the city decreased from 1158 in 1607 to only 493 in 1617, with the Sofia side described as 'deserted'. Novgorod only regained a measure of its former prosperity towards the end of the century, when such ambitious buildings as the Cathedral of the Sign and the Vyazhischi Monastery were constructed. The most famous of Muscovite patriarchs, Nikon, was active in Novgorod between 1648 and 1652. The Novgorod Land became one of the Old Believers' strongholds after the Schism. The city remained an important trade centre even though it was now eclipsed by Archangelsk, Novgorodian merchants were trading in the Baltic cities and Stockholm while Swedish merchants came to Novgorod where they had their own trading post since 1627. Novgorod continued to be a major centre of crafts which employed the majority of its population. There were more than 200 distinct professions in 16th century. Bells, cannons and other arms were produced in Novgorod; its silversmiths were famous for the skan' technique used for religious items and jewellery. Novgorod chests were in widespread use all across Russia, including the Tsar's household and the northern monasteries.

Russian Empire
In 1727, Novgorod was made the administrative center of Novgorod Governorate of the Russian Empire, which was detached from Saint Petersburg Governorate (see Administrative divisions of Russia in 1727–1728). This administrative division existed until 1927. Between 1927 and 1944, the city was a part of Leningrad Oblast, and then became the administrative center of the newly formed Novgorod Oblast.

Modern era
On August 15, 1941, during World War II, the city was occupied by the German Army. Its historic monuments were systematically obliterated. The Red Army liberated the city on January 19, 1944. Out of 2,536 stone buildings, fewer than forty remained standing. After the war, thanks to plans laid down by Alexey Shchusev, the central part was gradually restored. In 1992, the chief monuments of the city and the surrounding area were inscribed on the UNESCO World Heritage Site list as the Historic Monuments of Novgorod and Surroundings. As of 2020, regular archeological rescue work continues across the site. In 1999, the city was officially renamed Veliky Novgorod (literally, Great Novgorod), thus partly reverting to its medieval title "Lord Novgorod the Great". This reduced the temptation to confuse Veliky Novgorod with Nizhny Novgorod, a larger city the other side of Moscow which, between 1932 and 1990, had been renamed Gorky, in honour of Maxim Gorky.

Administrative and municipal status
Veliky Novgorod is the administrative center of the oblast and, within the framework of administrative divisions, it also serves as the administrative center of Novgorodsky District, even though it is not a part of it. As an administrative division, it is incorporated separately as the city of oblast significance of Veliky Novgorod—an administrative unit with status equal to that of the districts. As a municipal division, the city of oblast significance of Veliky Novgorod is incorporated as Veliky Novgorod Urban Okrug.

Sights

The city is known for the variety and age of its medieval monuments. The foremost among these is the St. Sophia Cathedral, built between 1045 and 1050 under the patronage of Vladimir Yaroslavich, the son of Yaroslav the Wise; Vladimir and his mother, Anna Porphyrogenita, are buried in the cathedral. It is one of the best preserved churches from the 11th century. It is also probably the oldest structure still in use in Russia and the first one to represent original features of Russian architecture (austere stone walls, five helmet-like domes). Its frescoes were painted in the 12th century originally on the orders of Bishop Nikita (died 1108) (the "porches" or side chapels were painted in 1144 under Archbishop Nifont) and renovated several times over the centuries, most recently in the nineteenth century. The cathedral features famous bronze gates, which now hang in the west entrance, allegedly made in Magdeburg in 1156 (other sources see them originating from Płock in Poland) and reportedly snatched by Novgorodians from the Swedish town of Sigtuna in 1187. More recent scholarship has determined that the gates were most likely purchased in the mid-15th century, apparently at the behest of Archbishop Euthymius II (1429–1458), a lover of Western art and architectural styles.

The Novgorod Kremlin, traditionally known as the Detinets, also contains the oldest palace in Russia (the so-called Chamber of the Facets, 1433), which served as the main meeting hall of the archbishops; the oldest Russian bell tower (mid-15th century), and the oldest Russian clock tower (1673). The Palace of Facets, the bell tower, and the clock tower were originally built on the orders of Archbishop Euphimius II, although the clock tower collapsed in the 17th century and had to be rebuilt and much of the palace of Euphimius II is no longer standing. Among later structures, the most remarkable are a royal palace (1771) and a bronze monument to the Millennium of Russia, representing the most important figures from the country's history (unveiled in 1862).

Outside the Kremlin walls, there are three large churches constructed during the reign of Mstislav the Great. St. Nicholas Cathedral (1113–1123), containing frescoes of Mstislav's family, graces Yaroslav's Court (formerly the chief square of Novgorod). The Yuriev Monastery (one of the oldest in Russia, 1030) contains a tall, three-domed cathedral from 1119 (built by Mstislav's son, Vsevolod, and Kyurik, the head of the monastery). A similar three-domed cathedral (1117), probably designed by the same masters, stands in the Antoniev Monastery, built on the orders of Antony, the founder of that monastery.

There are now some fifty medieval and early modern churches scattered throughout the city and its surrounding areas.  Some of them were blown up by the Nazis and subsequently restored. The most ancient pattern is represented by those dedicated to Saints Pyotr and Pavel (on the Swallow's Hill, 1185–1192), to Annunciation (in Myachino, 1179), to Assumption (on Volotovo Field, 1180s) and to St. Paraskeva-Piatnitsa (at Yaroslav's Court, 1207). The greatest masterpiece of early Novgorod architecture is the Savior church at Nereditsa (1198).

In the 13th century, tiny churches of the three-paddled design were in vogue. These are represented by a small chapel at the Peryn Monastery (1230s) and St. Nicholas' on the Lipnya Islet (1292, also notable for its 14th-century frescoes). The next century saw the development of two original church designs, one of them culminating in St Theodor's church (1360–1361, fine frescoes from 1380s), and another one leading to the Savior church on Ilyina street (1374, painted in 1378 by Feofan Grek). The Savior' church in Kovalevo (1345) was originally frescoed by Serbian masters, but the church was destroyed during the war. While the church has since been rebuilt, the frescoes have not been restored.

During the last century of the republican government, some new churches were consecrated to Saints Peter and Paul (on Slavna, 1367; in Kozhevniki, 1406), to Christ's Nativity (at the Cemetery, 1387), to St. John the Apostle's (1384), to the Twelve Apostles (1455), to St Demetrius (1467), to St. Simeon (1462), and other saints. Generally, they are not thought to be as innovative as the churches from the previous period. Several shrines from the 12th century (i.e., in Opoki) were demolished brick by brick and then reconstructed exactly as they used to be, several of them in the mid-fifteenth century, again under Archbishop Yevfimy II (Euthymius II), perhaps one of the greatest patrons of architecture in medieval Novgorod.

Novgorod's conquest by Ivan III in 1478 decisively changed the character of local architecture. Large commissions were thenceforth executed by Muscovite masters and patterned after cathedrals of Moscow Kremlin: e.g., the Savior Cathedral of Khutyn Monastery (1515), the Cathedral of the Mother of God of the Sign (1688), the St. Nicholas Cathedral of Vyaschizhy Monastery (1685). Nevertheless, the styles of some parochial churches were still in keeping with local traditions: e.g., the churches of Myrrh-bearing Women (1510) and of Saints Boris and Gleb (1586).

In Vitoslavlitsy, along the Volkhov River and the Myachino Lake, close to the Yuriev Monastery, a museum of wooden architecture was established in 1964. Over twenty wooden buildings (churches, houses and mills) dating from the 14th to the 19th century were transported there from all around the Novgorod region.

11400 graves of the German 1st Luftwaffe Field Division are found at the war cemetery in Novgorod. Also 1900 soldiers of the Spanish Blue Division are buried there.

Transportation

Intercity transport

Novgorod has connections to Moscow (531 km) and St. Petersburg (189 km) by the federal highway M10. There are public buses to Saint Petersburg and other destinations.

The city has direct railway passenger connections with Moscow (Leningradsky Rail Terminal, by night trains), St. Petersburg (Moscow Rail Terminal and Vitebsk Rail Terminal, by suburban trains), Minsk (Belarus) (Minsk Passazhirsky railway station, by night trains) and Murmansk.

The city's former commercial airport Yurievo was decommissioned in 2006, and the area has now been redeveloped into a residential neighbourhood. The still existing Krechevitsy Airport does not serve any regular flights since mid-1990s although there is a plan to turn Krechevitsy into a new operational airport by 2025.

Local transportation

Local transportation consists of a network of buses and trolleybuses. The trolleybus network, which currently consists of five routes, started operating in 1995 and is the first trolley system opened in Russia after the fall of the Soviet Union.

Honours
A minor planet, 3799 Novgorod, discovered by the Soviet astronomer Nikolai Stepanovich Chernykh in 1979, is named after the city.

Twin towns – sister cities

Veliky Novgorod is twinned with:

 Bielefeld, Germany
 Kohtla-Järve, Estonia 
 Moss, Norway
 Nanterre, France
 Örebro, Sweden
 Rochester, New York, USA
 Uusikaupunki, Finland
 Watford, UK
 Zibo, China

See also
Old Novgorod dialect
Novgorod uprising of 1650

References

Notes

Sources

William Craft Brumfield. A History of Russian Architecture (Seattle: Univ. of Washington Press, 2004) 
Peter Bogucki. Novgorod (in Lost Cities; 50 Discoveries in World Archaeology, edited by Paul G. Bahn: Barnes & Noble, Inc., 1997)

External links

Official website of Veliky Novgorod 
Veliky Novgorod City Portal
Veliky Novgorod for tourists
The Faceted Palace of the Kremlin in Novgorod the Great site
Veliky Novgorod's architecture and buildings history

 
 

 
Archaeological sites in Russia
Rus' settlements
Capitals of former nations
Trading posts of the Hanseatic League
Novgorodsky Uyezd
World Heritage Sites in Russia